Hill 24 Doesn't Answer, the first feature film produced in Israel, is a 1955 Israeli war film directed by Thorold Dickinson. It was entered into the 1955 Cannes Film Festival. The plot revolves around the personal stories of a number of soldiers who are on their way to defend a strategic hill overlooking the road to Jerusalem.

Plot 
In 1948, just four hours and 45 minutes before a ceasefire takes effect, Captain Yehuda Berger instructs four volunteers - James Finnegan, an Irish former British policeman (who fell in love with a Jewish woman named Miriam Miszrahi); Allan Goodman, a tourist from the USA who fell in love with the struggle to found Israel; David Airan; and (at her insistence) Esther Hadassi (a Yemeni Jewish woman) - to take and hold the strategic "Hill 24", one of a number of hills dominating the highway into Jerusalem.

Afterward, Finnegan relates how he first met Berger in 1946, two years before the start of the 1948 Arab–Israeli War, while serving as a British policeman in Haifa. In a flashback, Finnegan is part of the police force rounding up Jews who came ashore in British-controlled Mandatory Palestine illegally at night. Finnegan finds an ailing Berger and Miriam Miszrahi, and goes to find medical help for Berger. He is relieved to learn that the pair escaped. Berger is a concentration camp survivor who arrived in Palestine illegally during the British Mandate period and joined the Jewish Brigade group to help other Jews make Aliyah Bet.

Later Finnegan and Berger encounter one another at a checkpoint, where Berger is identified. Finnegan's superior lets Berger go, ordering Sergeant Finnegan to follow him and apprehend his associates. Berger spots the police tailing him and flees. The two policemen follow him all the way to an apartment, which turns out to be Miriam's, but Berger manages to get away. When Miriam gets home, she finds the police in her apartment. Miriam, a fourth generation local resident studying to be a teacher, is taken in for questioning and detained under the Emergency Defence Regulations. She is questioned about her relationship with Berger and the Jewish Underground. As she is being questioned Berger, who has been apprehended, is brought into the station.

Miriam is released the next morning. Finnegan and Browning are ordered to keep her under surveillance. After several fruitless days, Lawson tells Finnegan he can make Miriam's acquaintance, much to Finnegan's delight. Finnegan falls in love with her and he convinces her to return to Haifa with him, where she is arrested by Finnegan's superior. Miriam later joins the army to fight in the 1948 War, and Finnegan joins also. He reveals to his fellow soldiers that he is an Irish Christian. Miriam and Finnegan meet briefly as Finnegan is deployed to Hill 24. As they drive towards the site of the operation Goodman, a New Yorker, tells the story of how he and Hadassi first met when he was wounded during the battle for the Old City. Hadassi, working as a nurse, helped care for him until the forces surrendered. They then signed up for Bergen's unit together. The four die on the hill. Hadassi's body is found still clutching an Israeli flag. It is declared that the Hill has been claimed for Israel.

Cast

 Edward Mulhare as James Finnegan
 Haya Harareet as Miriam Miszrahi
  as Capt. Yehuda Berger (as Michael Shilo)
 Michael Wager as Allan Goodman
  as the Rabbi
 Margalit Oved as Esther Hadassi
 Haim Eynav as Ya'acov
 Arik Lavie as David Airam (as Arie Lavi)
  as the Mercenary
and in order of appearance.
 Eric Greene as Browning
 David Hershkovitz as Kiosk Owner
 Stanley Preston as Lawson
 Mati Raz as Interpreter
 Shraga Friedman as Travel Agent
 Ruth Rappaport as Hospital Nurse
 Shoshana Duer as Hospital Matron
 Arie Zeidmann as Itzik'l
 Leon Gilboa as French Official
 Abraham Barzilai as Arab Official
 David Ram as Israeli Official
 Burton Most as U.S. Official
Guest Players
 Shoshana Damari as The Druze Woman
  as The Jerusalem Commander (as Yosef Yadin)

References

External links

1955 films
Israeli black-and-white films
Films about the Arab–Israeli conflict
Films directed by Thorold Dickinson
Films set in 1946
Films set in 1948
Films set in Haifa
Hebrew-language films
English-language Israeli films
1950s English-language films
1950s multilingual films
Israeli multilingual films
Israeli war films
1955 war films